David Jelínek (born September 7, 1990) is a Czech professional basketball player for UCAM Murcia of the Liga ACB and the Basketball Champions League. He is a 1.96 m (6'5") tall shooting guard-small forward. He also represents the senior Czech Republic national team.

Professional career
Jelínek grew up playing basketball with BBK Brno, a team in the Czech Republic. He moved to Spain for the 2007–08 season, signed by Joventut Badalona. In the summer of 2012, Jelínek signed a contract with the Turkish club Olin Edirne, and in January 2013, he left the Turkish club and signed with the Spanish club Caja Laboral, where he remained until July 2014. 

In August 2014, he signed with the Russian team Krasnye Krylia. On January 2, 2015, he left Krylya and signed with Turkish club Uşak Sportif. for the rest of the season. On August 21, 2015, he signed with Polish club Anwil Włocławek, for the 2015–16 season. On July 5, 2016, he signed with MoraBanc Andorra, of the Spanish Liga ACB.

On July 10, 2022, he signed with UCAM Murcia of the Liga ACB and the Basketball Champions League.

National team career
Jelínek is a member of the senior Czech Republic national team. He played with the Czech Republic at the 2013 EuroBasket and the 2015 EuroBasket.

References

External links
 EuroLeague Profile
 FIBA Archive Profile
 FIBA Europe Profile
 Draftexpress.com Profile
 Spanish League Archive Profile 
 Turkish League Profile

1990 births
Living people
Basketball players at the 2020 Summer Olympics
BC Andorra players
Expatriate basketball people in Andorra
BC Krasnye Krylia players
CB Prat players
Czech expatriate basketball people in Spain
Czech expatriate basketball people in Turkey
Czech men's basketball players
Eskişehir Basket players
Joventut Badalona players
KK Włocławek players
Liga ACB players
Olympic basketball players of the Czech Republic
Saski Baskonia players
Shooting guards
Small forwards
Sportspeople from Brno
Uşak Sportif players